Group 2 consisted of five of the 34 teams entered into the European zone: Belgium, Republic of Ireland, France, Netherlands and Cyprus. These five teams competed on a home-and-away basis for two of the 14 spots in the final tournament allocated to the European zone, with the group's winner and runner-up claiming those spots.

Standings

Results

Notes

External links 
Group 2 Detailed Results at RSSSF

2
1980–81 in Belgian football
1981–82 in Belgian football
1980–81 in Cypriot football
1981–82 in Cypriot football
1980–81 in Dutch football
1981–82 in Dutch football
1980–81 in French football
1981–82 in French football
1980–81 in Republic of Ireland association football
1981–82 in Republic of Ireland association football